Jincheon Gilsangsa (Korean: 진천 길상사; Hanja: 鎭川 吉祥祠; literally "shrine of a lucky omen in Jincheon") is a shrine dedicated to the portrait of general Gim Yu-sin (595~673) who was the leading figure in the unification of the three kingdoms of Goguryeo, Baekje, and Silla.  It is located in Jincheon-eup, Jincheon-gun, Chungcheongbuk-do and designated as the first monument in Chungcheongbuk-do on 21 February 1975.

History 

Gilsangsa, or Shrine Gilsang, was built under Taeryeongsan  (태령산; 胎靈山; Mountain Taeryeong ) where the tae (태; 胎; refers to tissues such as placenta or umbilical cord) of General Gim Yu-sin was buried. Ever since the Silla times, memorial services were held there by a national government and since Taejong of Joseon Dynasty they were also held by a local government.  The shrine fell into ruin during Imjinwaeran (임진왜란; 壬辰倭亂; Japanese invasion of Korea) and Byeongjahoran (병자호란; 丙子胡亂; Qing invasion of Korea).  

In the second year of Cheoljong of Joseon (1851), a shrine named Jukgyesa (죽계사; 竹溪祠; Shrine Jukgye) in the village of Gaejuk, Gusu-ri, Baekgok-myeon, beyond the birthplace of Taeryeongsan was built and held memorial services for the general by Jeong Jaegyeong(정재경), Bak Myeongsun (박명순), and others.  However, Jukgyesa was demolished in the wake of the abolition of Seowson by Heungseon Daewongun in the 1st year of Gojong of Joseon (1864). After that, in the third year of Gojong (1866), the shrine of Seobalhansadang (서발한사당; 舒發翰祠堂; Shrine Seobalhan) under Dodangsanseong (도당산성; 都堂山城, Mountain Fortress Dodang ) was rebuilt and a spirit tablet called Gyeyangmyo (계양묘; 桂陽廟; Spirit tablet Gyeyang) was placed there. The shrine collapsed  again in 1922 due to a great flood. In 1926, with the efforts of Gim Manhee (김만희),  the descendant of the general Gim Yu-sin, it was reestablished at the foot of Dodangsan (도당산; 都堂山; Mountain Dodang), the place where it is now and named Gilsangsa. The name of Gilsangsa originated from where Taeryeongsan was called Gilsangsan (길상산; 吉祥山; Mountain Gilsang).  

Gilsangsa was severely damaged during the Korean War of 1950 but reconstructed in 1959. Finally, it was completely rebuilt in 1975 as part of the historic sites managing project (사적지 정화사업) and since then remains open to visitors.

Structure 

The main hall is "Heungmujeon" (흥무전; 興武殿; Hall of Heungmu), a concrete tiled roof consisting of five compartments in front, and two compartments in side with the gambrel roof of Jusimpo (주심포; 柱心包), with the portrait of General Gim Yu-sin enshrined inside.  Also inside are Heungmudaewangsinseongbi (흥무대왕신성비; 興武大王神聖碑, Shinseong Monument of the Great King Heungmu) built in 1957 in the outer side of the main hall, the memorial stone of General Gim Yu-sin (김유신장군사적비; 金庾信將軍事蹟碑) built 1976 in the inner courtyard, and the memorial stone of rebuilding of Jincheon Gilsangsa (길상사중건사적비; 吉祥祠 重建事蹟碑) built in 1976 at the entrance.

See also 
 Gim Yu-sin

Reference 

Ancestral shrines
Monuments and memorials in South Korea
North Chungcheong Province
Tourism in South Korea by city
Jincheon County
Religious buildings and structures